The Komunidad ng Pamilya Pasyente at Persons with Disabilities, also known as the P3PWD Party List, is a political organization seeking party-list representation in the House of Representatives of the Philippines.

Background
The P3PWD Party List ran in the 2022 House of Representatives elections managing to secure a single seat. The party listed Grace Yaneza, Ira Paulo Pozon, Marianne Heidi Fullon, Peter Jonas David, and Lili Grace Tiangco as its official nominees while former Commission on Elections commissioner Rowena Guanzon was actively involved in the organization's campaigning. P3PWD aims to represent the interest of persons with disabilities (PWDs) and patients.

Guanzon announced herself as the presumptive representative for P3PWD, despite not being on the organization's official nominees list. At that time, the Commission on Elections stated that it has also not received any documents for substitution that would make Guanzon eligible to fill in P3PWD's seat. 

On June 14, 2022, all five of the party's official nominees resigned, with three of the nominees citing personal reasons. The party submitted a certificate of nomination to the COMELEC that day, comprising Rowena Guanzon, Rosalie Garcia, Cherrie Belmonte-Lim, Donnabel Tenorio, and Rodolfo Villar Jr. 

Acting COMELEC spokesperson Rex Laudiangco confirmed that the COMELEC has received their new certificate of nomination, stating that the "matter is subject to the deliberation of the Commission en banc".

On June 15, the COMELEC en banc allowed Guanzon to sit as the party's first nominee.

Legal actions
On June 21, 2022, Duterte Youth party-list filed a petition asking the Supreme Court (SC) to prohibit Guanzon from taking a seat designated for the P3PWD party-list. The SC decided on June 29 to temporarily stop a COMELEC resolution allowing her substitution.

Prior to the decision from the SC, the COMELEC en banc denied Duterte Youth's complaint against the substitution of Guanzon.

Meanwhile, Guanzon, on June 21, filed libel and unjust vexation charges against Duterte Youth chairman and National Youth Commission chairman Ronald Cardema before the Quezon City Prosecution Office; and on June 28, filed a complaint against him before the Office of the Ombudsman, all regarding the latter's statements in connection to her substitution.

Electoral performance

Representatives to Congress

References

Party-lists represented in the House of Representatives of the Philippines